Kurrawonga Falls are a waterfall located in the Mount Kaputar National Park, approximately  east of the town of Narrabri in northern New South Wales, Australia.

Geography
The falls are a permanent feature of the Horsearm Creek . The creek flows through dense native bushland across the Kaputa Plateau and into a steep chasm in the surrounding rocks, falling over  into a sinkhole beneath.  The volume of the falls varies with seasonal rainfall.

Access
The falls, along with the historic Scutts Hutt, are accessible via a return hike of approximately  along the Scutts Hutt Firetrail from Kaputar Road, a public road, and the nearby Bark Hut camping grounds. Branching from the trail is a  track to the hut which is sign-posted, but the last  leading down to the falls is not. Average journey time is 10-12 hours, and mobile phone coverage is extremely limited.

2020 Bushfires
In January-February 2020 the bushfires that ravaged eastern Australia swept through the national park, forcing its temporary closure, and access to the falls and other attractions were closed to the public.

References

External links
 NSW National Parks and Wildlife Service - Scutts Hut and Kurrawonga Falls walk
 Narrabri Region Information Directory - Mount Kaputar National Park
 Australian Walking Track Grading System

Waterfalls of New South Wales